Capital Karts is an indoor go karting track based in Barking, East London. It is the largest indoor track in the UK at over 1,050m long and has won multiple awards. Established in 2013 by co-founders Matthew Holyfield and Alastair Flynn in a derelict warehouse near Barking, the Capital Karts track was seeing over 500 visitors each weekend and had an annual turnover of £2m within 2 years.

Capital Karts offers go-karting for adults, children, and disabled drivers.

Track 
The Capital Karts track on Rippleside in East London is 1,050m long and underwent refurbishment in 2016 to increase average track speed, improve overtaking opportunities, and further enhance the safety barrier system. The karts reach top speeds of 45 mph and a lap takes approximately 70 seconds to complete. There are 20 corners and the track has an average width of eight metres.

The Johnny Herbert Karting Challenge has been held at the Capital Karts track since 2013. More than 100 drivers compete in a 3-hour endurance race with charitable donations being raised by teams, and additional donations raised during the trackside sale of racing memorabilia. The event raised more than £10,000 in its first year. In April 2014, bookmakers Ladbrokes filmed their betting advert at the Capital Karts track.

The Karts 
RiMO Alpha karts used at Capital Karts feature a 270cc Honda LPG tuned engine. The same karts are used in karting tracks around Europe

The karts are suitable for adults, children and disabled visitors, and there are karts that are equipped for use by two people.

Awards 
Since its inception in 2013, Capital Karts has won a number of awards.

 2014 Barking and Dagenham New Business Of The Year
 2015 East London New Business Of The Year
 2015 Karting Magazine Indoor Track Of The Year
 2015 TripAdvisor Certificate of Excellence
 2016 TripAdvisor Certificate of Excellence

References

External links 
 Capital Karts website

Motorsport venues in England
Sports venues in London